Francis Wolfe may refer to:

Francis Wolfe (writer), winner of Ann Connor Brimer Award
Francis Wolfe (Royalist), associate of Richard Penderel
Francis X. Wolfe, the pseudonym of director Francis Delia

See also
Frances Wolfe, actress
Frank Wolfe (disambiguation)
Francis Wolff, record company executive, photographer and producer